is part of the Ishikari Mountains, Hokkaidō, Japan.

See also
List of mountains and hills of Japan by height

References
 Hokkaido, Seamless Digital Geological Map of Japan, Geological Survey of Japan, AIST (ed.). 2007.]

Yuniishikari